Berenika Tomsia (born March 18, 1988) is a Polish volleyball player. She is a gold medalist of Summer Universiade Bangkok 2007 and bronze medalist of Summer Universiade Belgrad 2009.

Career

Clubs
Berenika Tomsia played for Fenerbahçe in the 2012 FIVB Club World Championship held in Doha, Qatar and helped her team to win the bronze medal after defeating Puerto Rico's Lancheras de Cataño 3-0. She was selected to play the Italian League All-Star game in 2017.

Sporting achievements

Clubs

CEV Cup
  2012/2013 - with Fenerbahçe

FIVB Club World Championship
  Qatar 2012 - with Fenerbahçe

KOVO V-League 

  Season 2018-19 with Incheon Heungkuk Life Insurance Pink Spiders

National championships
 2008/2009  Polish Cup, with BKS Stal Bielsko-Biała
 2008/2009  Polish Championship, with BKS Stal Bielsko-Biała
 2009/2010  Polish Championship, with BKS Stal Bielsko-Biała
 2010/2011  Polish SuperCup, with BKS Stal Bielsko-Biała
 2010/2011  Polish Championship, with BKS Stal Bielsko-Biała

National team

Universiade
  2007 Bangkok
  2009 Belgrad

Individually
 2011 Polish Cup - Best Blocker
 2013 CEV Cup - Best Blocker

References

Polish women's volleyball players
1988 births
Living people
Sportspeople from Gdańsk
Fenerbahçe volleyballers
Universiade medalists in volleyball
Universiade gold medalists for Poland
Universiade bronze medalists for Poland
Medalists at the 2007 Summer Universiade
Medalists at the 2009 Summer Universiade